The following is a list of World Championship Wrestling attendance records. Founded as Jim Crockett Promotions in 1931, it was one of the first professional wrestling promotions in the United States. Upon joining the National Wrestling Alliance in 1951, the Crockett family controlled the NWA's "Mid-Atlantic wrestling territory" which included the Carolinas and Virginia, and was long regarded as one of the organization's most powerful members. Jim Crockett Jr. became the face of the NWA as he battled Vince McMahon's World Wrestling Federation during the 1980s wrestling boom but was ultimately forced into bankruptcy.

After the sale of JCP to Ted Turner in 1988, the company was rebranded as World Championship Wrestling (WCW). For the next six years, WCW saw record-low attendances under the management of Turner executive Jim Herd. In 1995, WCW experienced a resurgence under Eric Bischoff following the creation of WCW Monday Nitro, debut of The Outsiders  and "heel turn" of Hulk Hogan, and subsequent formation of the New World Order. A new rivalry with the WWF, known as the "Monday Night Wars", was a major force driving the 1990s wrestling boom. WCW's pay-per-view events and Nitro's live television episodes during this period would surpass almost all of the previous records set by JCP during the 1970s and 80s. Outside the U.S., WCW partnered with New Japan Pro Wrestling (NJPW) to promote the WCW/New Japan Supershows between 1991 and 1994, which set a number of attendance records in Japan. In 1995, both companies co-hosted the two-day Collision in Korea pay-per-view (PPV) event at May Day Stadium in Pyongyang, North Korea. With a combined crowd of 320,000, it is the highest attended wrestling event of all-time.

The list is dominated by WCW's flagship Monday Nitro television program, which aired from various arenas and locations across the world during its 5-year run. Only seven of the attendances listed are exclusively WCW events, with JCP's Great American Bash '85, Great American Bash '86 and Great American Bash '87 being the only house show events on the list. All but four of the events included have been held in the United States where WCW was based, while three have been held in Japan and one in the North Korea.

Events and attendances

Historical

See also
List of professional wrestling attendance records
List of professional wrestling attendance records in Canada
List of professional wrestling attendance records in Europe
List of professional wrestling attendance records in Japan
List of professional wrestling attendance records in Mexico
List of professional wrestling attendance records in Puerto Rico
List of professional wrestling attendance records in the United Kingdom
List of professional wrestling attendance records in the United States
List of WWE attendance records

References
General
 
 

Specific

External links
Cards With Highest Claimed Attendance from The Internet Wrestling Database
Supercards & Tournaments at ProWrestlingHistory.com
JCP & WCW attendance records at Wrestlingdata.com

National Wrestling Alliance
Attendance records
Attendance records
Professional wrestling attendances
Attendance records